Damen Shaw (born 22 April 1974) is a former Australian rules footballer who played with St Kilda in the Australian Football League (AFL).

Originally from St Peters, Shaw played senior football with St Kilda for three seasons. He had his best year in 1994, when he amassed 365 disposals from his 21 appearances, which only Nathan Burke and Robert Harvey bettered at St Kilda.

Following his delisting by St Kilda, Shaw transferred to South Australian National Football League (SANFL) side Port Adelaide in 1997, in the hope of being drafted by Port's AFL side but was disappointing, only playing 12 games for six goals for Port Magpies.

References

1974 births
Australian rules footballers from Victoria (Australia)
St Kilda Football Club players
Port Adelaide Football Club (SANFL) players
Port Adelaide Football Club players (all competitions)
Living people